The Glasgow Academical Football Club is the third oldest rugby football club in Scotland. The club was also a founder member of the Scottish Football Union (the future SRU) in 1873.

History

Glasgow Hawks

In 1997 the decision was made to combine the first XV's of Glasgow Academicals and close rivals Glasgow High Kelvinside (themselves a fairly new club having been formed when the struggling Glasgow High FP and Kelvinside Academicals clubs combined in 1982), something that was predicted would happen only after "hell freezes over". The combined team was named the Glasgow Hawks. The Hawks won the second division championship and the Scottish Cup in their first year and have since continued in the first division - winning the league in 2004, 2005 and 2006, and the Cup again in 2004 and 2007. Glenn Metcalfe together with Derek Stark and Gordon McIlwham became Scottish Internationals while Mike Beckham and Tommy Hayes played for the Cook Islands.

Glasgow Academicals
With the advent of the Hawks, the Glasgow Academicals lost many of their strong first XV but made the decision to continue as a league side for the following year - which under SRU rules meant that they had to rejoin the lowest league of Scottish rugby. In 1998 the club competed in Glasgow District division 3. The club raced back up through the leagues, being promoted as league champions five years in succession.

In 2016, their 150th year, they won West Regional League Division One giving them promotion to Scottish National League Division Three for 2016/17, after only losing one league game all season.  Of the 157 clubs in the National and Regional leagues in 2015–16, only three had a winning % record which bettered Accies.  Success came on the 9 April 2016 with a 26–7 win over Allan Glens at the Bearyards. Days after winning the league, the 150th year of the club was celebrated in April 2016, with a 1st XV match against a team mainly principally from West of Scotland F.C. but including representatives from the other six clubs who, along with Accies and West, had founded the SRU in 1873.

In recent years, the club has toured overseas to destinations including Zimbabwe (defeating leading province Matabeleland), United States (Carolina), Poland, in the 150th year Luxembourg, and most recently Budapest in 2017.

In 2017 the club finished third. They did win 13 games in a row, including a 163–10 defeat of Livingston, followed up by 95–0 against Greenock Wanderers the following week.  The final “points for” tally in the league was 930 from 22 games – the highest in the national leagues – with a points difference of 600.

In April 2018, Accies secured promotion to National 2 with an 8-try win at Murrayfield Wanderers.

Glasgow Academicals Sevens

The club run the Glasgow Academicals Sevens. Their first Sevens tournament was in 1908 to raise funds to pay for their pavilion, but their Sevens was re-started in 1969 as an annual tournament.

Honours

Scottish Unofficial Championship
Champions (14): 1871–72, 1872–73, 1873–74, 1875–76, 1876–77, 1882–83, 1903–04, 1904–05, 1912–13, 1921–22, 1923–24, 1924–25, 1925–26, 1929–30
 Scottish National League Division One
Champions (2): 1983–84, 1985–86
Scottish National League Division Two
Champions (3): 1979–80, 1995–96, 2003–04
 Scottish National League Division Three
 Runners-Up (1): 2017-18
Glasgow District 3
Champions: 1998-99
Glasgow District 2
Champions: 1999-2000
Glasgow District 1
Champions: 2000-01
Scottish National League Division Five
Champions: 2001-02
Scottish National League Division Four
Champions: 2002-03
BT Shield 
Runners-up: 2003-04
West League
Champions: 2015-16
 Glasgow Academicals Sevens
 Champions: 1971, 1992
 West of Scotland Sevens
 Champions: 2018, 2019
 Lochaber Sevens
 Champions: 1993
 Kelvinside Academicals Sevens
 Champions: 1976
 Arran Sevens
 Champions: 2017
 Hillhead HSFP Sevens
 Champions: 1969
 Glasgow University Sevens
 Champions: 1941, 1962, 1964, 1969, 1982, 1999
 Clarkston Sevens
 Champions: 1962, 1964, 1967, 1968, 1969
 Bearsden Sevens
 Champions: 1977
 Strathendrick Sevens
 Champions: 1992, 1993
 Allan Glen's Sevens
 Champions: 1977, 1982, 1986
 Ayr Sevens
 Champions: 1966, 1969, 1984
 Greenock Sevens
 Champions: 1976
 Hawick Sevens
 Champions (1): 1939
 Gala Sevens
 Champions (1): 1939
 Kilmarnock Sevens
 Champions: 1942
 Helensburgh Sevens
 Champions: 2022
 Dundee City Sevens
 Champions: 2022

SRU presidents
15 Glasgow Academicals have been President of the SRU: 
 1874-75 Albert Harvey
 1878-79 George Raphael Fleming
 1880-81 David Watson
 1882-83 William Cross
 1884-85 Malcolm Cross
 1886-87 James S. Carrick
 1903-04 Robert Greig
 1911-12 William Andrew Walls
 1924-25 Robert Campbell MacKenzie
 1933-34 John MacGill
 1953-54 Malcolm Allan
 1956-57 Max Simmers
 1963-64 Herbert Waddell 
 1969-70 George Crerar
 1977-78 Frank Coutts

International players

  JW Arthur (first capped 1871)
  William Davie Brown (first capped 1871) - Scotland captain in 1874-75
  Thomas Chalmers (first capped 1871)
  William Cross (first capped 1871) - scorer of the first ever international conversion!  SRU President 1882-83
  Daniel Drew (first capped 1871)
  John Shaw Thomson (first capped 1871)
All six of these players played in the first ever rugby international - 
on 27 March 1871 - when Scotland beat England by 1 goal (2 tries) to nil (1 try).
  James H. McClure (first capped 1872) - with George - the first ever twins to be capped!
  Henry William Allan (first capped 1873)
  Charles Chalmers Bryce (first capped 1873)
  George B. McClure (first capped 1873) - with James - the first ever twins to be capped!
  Gilbert Heron (first capped 1874)
  John Kennedy Tod (first capped 1874)
  Allan Arthur (first capped 1875)
  Malcolm Cross (first capped 1875) - SRU President 1884-85
  George Raphael Fleming (first capped 1875)
  James S. Carrick (first capped 1876) - SRU President 1886-87
  John Junor (first capped 1876)
  David Watson (first capped 1876) - SRU President 1880-81
  Sir Robert C. McKenzie KBE CB (first capped 1877) - SRU President 1924-25
  Stewart Henry Smith (first capped 1877) - 2 caps
  James A. Campbell (first capped 1878)
  John Alexander Neilson (first capped 1878)
  Gussie Graham (first capped 1878)
  Duncan Irvine (first capped 1878)
  George Macleod (first capped 1878)
  John Blair Brown (first capped 1879)
  Edward Ewart (first capped 1879)
  David McCowan (first capped 1880)
  Bryce Allan (first capped 1881)
  James Fraser (first capped 1881)
  George Robb (first capped 1881)
  William Andrew Walls (first capped 1882) - SRU President 1911-12
  David Kidston (first capped 1883) 2 caps
  John Mowat (first capped 1883)
  J. French (first capped 1886)
  Flowerdew Macindoe (first capped 1886)
  Hugh Ker (first capped 1887)
  Alexander Woodrow (first capped 1887)
  J. G. McKendrick (first capped 1889)
  Robert Greig (first capped 1893) - SRU President 1903-04
  David D. Robertson (first capped 1893) - 1900 Olympic bronze medal for GB at Golf!
  James Bishop (first capped 1893)
  Bill Donaldson (first capped 1893)
  Alexander H. Anderson (first capped 1894)
  Robert S. Stronach (first capped 1901)
  Lewis MacLeod (first capped 1904)
  William Milne (first capped 1904)
  Harold McCowat (first capped 1905)
  Douglas Schulze (first capped 1905)
  William L. Russell (first capped 1905)
  Tennant Sloan (first capped 1905)
   Louis Greig (first capped 1905) - 3 tests for British Lions (SA 1903)
  William Campbell Church (first capped 1906)   † killed in WWI (Gallipoli)
  J. A. Brown (first capped 1908)
  Jimmy Dobson (first capped 1910) - 1 cap
 Robert "Bertie" B. Waddell, uncapped by Scotland, toured in 1910 with the "Combined British" squad to Argentina, retrospectively classed as a British Lions tour.
  Alexander Stevenson (first capped 1911)
  John Dobson (first capped 1911) - 6 caps
  Jack Warren (first capped 1914) - 1 cap
  Eric Templeton Young (first capped 1914) - 1 cap   † killed in WWI (Gallipoli)
  Robert A. Gallie (first capped 1920) - 8 caps
  Eric MacKay (first capped 1920) - 2 caps
  George M. Murray (first capped 1921) - 2 caps
  J.C. "Jimmy" Dykes (first capped 1922) - 20 caps.
  Andrew Stevenson (first capped 1922) - 4 caps
  Ronald C. Warren (first capped 1922) - 5 caps
  Robert S. Simpson (first capped 1923) - 1 cap
   Herbert Waddell (first capped 1924) - 15 caps for Scotland and 3 tests for British Lions (SA 1924). - SRU President 1963-64
  James Gilchrist (first capped 1925) - 1 cap
  Jimmy Nelson, (first capped 1925) - 25 caps 
  William H. Stevenson (first capped 1925) - 1 cap
  Max Simmers, (first capped 1926) - 28 caps  - SRU President 1956-57
    Edward G. Taylor (first capped 1927) - 2 caps for Scotland and 3 tests for British Lions, 1927 "unofficial" tour to Argentina - Argentina's first ever test matches
  Harry Greenlees (first capped 1927) - 6 caps
  Thomas M. Hart (first capped 1930) - 2 caps - also capped twice for Scotland Cricket - 1933-34
  James Forrest (first capped 1932) - 3 caps
  Andrew Dykes (first capped 1932) - 1 cap
  Ronald O. Murray (first capped 1935) - 2 caps
   Laurie Duff (first capped 1936) - Scotland 6 caps and British Lions (1938 SA Tour - 2 tests, 2 tries!)
  C. Robert Bruce (first capped 1947) - 8 caps
  Frank Coutts (first capped 1947) - 3 caps - SRU President 1977-78
  J. Hamish" C. Dawson (first capped 1947) - 20 caps
  Brian Simmers (first capped 1965) - 7 caps - scorer of two dropped goals in one international (v Wales, 1965) - a record for Scotland held jointly with, among others, John Rutherford, Craig Chalmers and Dan Parks
  Mike A. Smith (first capped 1970) - 4 caps
   John Beattie (first capped 1980) - 25 caps for Scotland and 2 tests for British Lions (NZ 1983, Rest of the World 1986); member of Scotland's 1984 Grand Slam squad
  Marty Berry (first capped 1986) - 1 cap - Glasgow Accies' first All Black
  Glenn Metcalfe (first capped 1998) - 40 caps - our most-capped internationalist; member of Scotland's 1999 Championship winning XV
  Johnnie Beattie (first capped 2006) - 38 caps - our most-capped former pupil; scorer of the 2010 6 Nations Try of the Tournament against Ireland
  Andreas Nilserius (first capped 2015) - Swedish cap from Glasgow Accies' 2015-16 Championship-winning squad
  Chris Nilserius (first capped 2016) - Swedish cap from 2015 to 2016 Championship-winning XV, currently playing in Glasgow Accies' 2016-17 1st XV
  Phillip Axelsson (first capped 2016) - Swedish cap currently playing in Glasgow Accies' 2016-17 1st XV
  Robert Beattie (first capped 2016) - won his first cap for Scotland 7s in the Cape Town Sevens in December 2016

References

 Massie, Allan A Portrait of Scottish Rugby (Polygon, Edinburgh)

External links
http://www.glasgowacciesrfc.com/
https://web.archive.org/web/20090421091136/http://www.glasgowhawks.com/cms/history
http://www.accies.ukf.net/Rugby/

Rugby clubs established in 1866
Scottish rugby union teams
Rugby union in Glasgow
1866 establishments in Scotland
Sports teams in Glasgow